Ryan O'Neill may refer to:

Ryan O'Neill (American soccer) (born 1978), American soccer midfielder
Ryan O'Neill (Northern Irish footballer) (born 1990), Northern Irish footballer

See also
Ryan O'Neal (born 1941), American actor